Anouki Areshidze (stylized as ANOUKI; born Ana Areshidze) is a Georgian fashion designer based in Tbilisi.

Areshidze studied at Istituto Marangoni and Accademia del Lusso in Milan.

Areshidze is married to the retired footballer and current mayor of Tbilisi, Kakha Kaladze. The couple have four children together. Their first son, Levan, was named after Kaladze's late brother, who was kidnapped and murdered in 2001.

References

Businesspeople from Tbilisi
Living people
Fashion designers from Georgia (country)
Year of birth missing (living people)
Place of birth missing (living people)